The 1977–78 West Midlands (Regional) League season was the 78th in the history of the West Midlands (Regional) League, an English association football competition for semi-professional and amateur teams based in the West Midlands county, Shropshire, Herefordshire, Worcestershire and southern Staffordshire.

Premier Division

The Premier Division featured 19 clubs which competed in the division last season, no new clubs joined the Premier Division this season.

League table

References

External links

1977–78
W